Hookworms were an English five-piece neo-psychedelic rock band from Leeds/Halifax that formed in 2010. Between 2010 and 2018 the band released 3 studio albums and became known for their live shows.

Anonymous allegations of abuse by an unnamed woman that were reported by a third party against the band’s singer saw the dissolution of the Hookworms in 2018.

Biography 

Hookworms released their first tape cassette EP on Sun Araw's Sun Ark/Magic Lantern label in August 2011. They were known for their live shows. They released live recordings (including a CD release of their WFMU live session) and several other releases through Gringo Records. In 2013 Hookworms signed with the Domino imprint Weird World; they also joined the Too Pure roster with their single "Radio Tokyo."

Hookworm's 2013 LP Pearl Mystic was widely praised. It was named  the number 1 album of 2013 by Loud and Quiet, BrooklynVegan, and Drowned in Sound. Their second LP The Hum also received positive critical reviews.

The band was composed of EO, JN, JW, MB, and MJ. They produced through MJ's own Suburban Home Studio in Leeds. All related art was done through JW's Idiot's Pasture. Fans of Hookworms included Bobby Gillespie, Charlotte Church, and
Julian Cope, who described their 2011 EP as "an epic 26 minutes of sub-Zabriskie Point ambient road-movie heat haze-on-the-road sonic wipeout of the post-Loop variety."

On 30 October 2018, Alanna McCardle - formerly a member of Welsh group Joanna Gruesome and a former partner of Hookworms singer Matthew Johnson - took to Twitter to post a series of tweets on behalf of another unnamed woman, referred to only as 'L', who had also been in a relationship with Johnson. In the tweets, McCardle reported allegations made to her by 'L' of her experience of sexual assault by Matthew 'MJ' Johnson. Johnson issued a statement denying the accusations.

In her assessment of the allegations, McCardle called attention to the frequent and strident messages posted by the official Hookworms social media accounts as well as Johnson's own personal accounts regarding their staunch feminist and anti-abuse ethic - particularly in the context of the music industry. McCardle suggested that this was a strategy intended to somehow mitigate or distract from Johnson's alleged history of abusive behaviour. The next day, the band announced their breakup.

In the aftermath of the widely covered allegations made against the singer on Twitter which resulted in the band's breakup - Johnson appeared to remove himself entirely from social media. The website for, and most references to, his recording studio business also appear to have been largely removed from the internet.

In March 2020, Johnson brought legal proceedings  against McCardle and ‘L’ for malicious falsehood and defamation. This litigation was subsequently withdrawn in May 2021, following the withdrawal of the McCardle's blogpost.

To date, 'L' remains anonymous.

Discography

Studio albums 
Pearl Mystic – Gringo Records (UK), Domino Records (rest of world), LP/CD/MP3 (2013)
The Hum – Domino Records, LP/CD/MP3 (2014)
Microshift – Domino Records, LP/CD/MP3 (2018)

Full lengths 
Hookworms – Sun Ark/Magic Lantern, Cassette (2011)
Hookworms – Gringo Records/Faux Discx, 12" LP/MP3 (2011)

Singles 
Split w/ Kogumaza – Gringo Records, 7"/MP3 (2012)
Radio Tokyo/On Returning – Too Pure Singles Club release, 7" (2013)

Live releases / Compilation appearances / Remixes 
"Starting Line": Runners Remix – Dummy Mag, 12" single/MP3 (2011)
Live Vol. 1 – Self release, Cassette/MP3 (2012)
Spur: Volume One Compilation, w/ "Deu" – Magnetic Tapes, Cassette (2012)
Live Vol. 2: WFMU session – Cardinal Fuzz, CD & DVD (2012)
"Bodies": Mazes Remix – Fat Cat Records, Cassette/MP3 (2012)
"Run To Your Mama": MJ Goat Remix – Rocket Recordings Record Store Day release, 12"/CD (2012)
Psych For Sore Eyes EP compilation, w/ "The Correspondent" – Sonic Cathedral, 7" (2013)
Live Vol. 3 – Domino Records, Rough Trade exclusive "The Hum" bonus CD (2014)

References

External links 

 

English psychedelic rock music groups
Neo-psychedelia groups
English space rock musical groups
Musical groups established in 2010
Musical groups disestablished in 2018
Musical groups from Leeds
2010 establishments in England